The 2015–16 Irani Cup, also called 2015–16 Irani Trophy, was the 54th season of the Irani Cup, a first-class cricket competition in India. It was played as a one-off match from 6 March to 10 March 2016 between the 2015–16 Ranji champions, Mumbai and the Rest of India team. Naman Ojha will captain the Rest of India team. The match was held at Brabourne Stadium, Mumbai.

Squads

Match

References 

Irani Cup
2016 in Indian cricket
Irani Cup